Ricardo de Jaxa Małachowski (born 14 May 1887 Odessa, died 6 September 1972, Lima) – was a Polish-Peruvian architect, active in Peru, one of the major architects of the capital city of Lima.

Overview 
Ricardo (Polish: Ryszard Jaxa-Małachowski Kulisicz), was a Peruvian architect of Polish and Slovak origin. He worked in Lima, Peru for nearly all of his professional career. He designed and helped build over 15 important buildings in Lima. He married María, the love of his life. He wrote a book entitled “Lessons Of Elements And Theory Of Architecture” (Lecciones de Elementos y Teoría de la Arquitectura).

Life 
Ricardo de Jaxa Malchowski was born on May 14, 1887 in Odessa at the very southwest of the Russian Empire (current day Ukraine). He is the son of Agusto de Jaxa Malachowski and Malwina Kulisicz .  His Father was Agusto (Pole) and his mother was Malwina (Slovakian).

At age 13, Ricardo traveled to Saint Petersburg and applied to the Navy Academy of Odessa. However, he was not admitted into the program because of his poor vision. He then continued his education in a secondary school in Odessa, where he graduated in 1905. 
He traveled to Paris shortly after to attend the École des Beaux-Arts and pursued architecture. The architect Malachowski arrived in Lima on December 22, 1911. He immediately was put to work by President Augusto B. Lengía, who asked him to design and install the sacristy of the chapel of the Government Palace.

In 1914 he married María Benavides Diez Canseco, the daughter of the future president. Together, they had 4 children: Maria, Malvina, Augusto and Ricardo.

Malachowski is known as the main architect of Government Palace of Peru in Lima (1938; also involved were arch. Claude Sahut). Some of his other important projects include Rímac Building (1919–24), Congress Building, façade of the Archbishop's Palace (1924), interiors of the Mayor's Office in Lima, the National Club, Society of Engineers, façade of the City's Theatre, Office of Deposits & Consignations, Bank of Italia (today Credit Bank), Embassy of Colombia, urban design and a preliminary design of the buildings at the principal Avenue Paseo de la Republica and the Dos de Mayo Square.

He was the architect of various buildings in the center of Lima, residential sectors of Lima and sea resorts (such as Santa María del Mar, Distrito de San Bartolo, Santa María de Chosica). Malachowski was an impact to the overall architecture of Lima, Peru in the time that he lived and worked there.

He died on December 6, 1972 in Lima, at the age of 85.

Theory of Architecture 

	Malachowski wrote the book, Lessons of Elements and Theory Of Architecture with the intentions of putting all his teaching material into one place. He taught the course of Elements and Theory of Architecture at the Escuela Nacional de Ingenieros (National School of Engineering) in Lima between 1915 and 1944. This book is a substantial contribution to the theories and the Peruvian architectural thought. Containing 141 sketches, the first edition was published in 1944. As of today, it is only published in Spanish.

See also 
 Government Palace of Peru
 Legislative Palace (Peru)
 Ricardo J. Malachowski Benavides
 Historic Centre of Lima
 Peruvian Colonial Architecture
 Embassy of Colombia, Lima

External Links and Sources 

 http://www.limalaunica.pe/2010/08/la-casa-suarez.html
 http://www.worldcat.orgwww.worldcat.org/title/lecciones-de-elementos-y-teoria-de-la-arquitectura/oclc/951551802
 http://www.arcadiamediatica.com/libro/lecciones-de-elementos-y-teoria-de-la-arquitectura-_26938
 https://www.geni.com/people/Ryszard-de-Jaxa-Malachowski-Kulisicz/6000000007771995514

1887 births
1972 deaths
People from Kherson Governorate
Peruvian architects
People from Odesa
Emigrants from the Russian Empire to Peru